Panos (Panagiotis) Kouvelis is the Emerson Distinguished Professor of Supply Chain, Operations, and Technology and director of The Boeing Center for Supply Chain Innovation at the Olin Business School at Washington University in St. Louis.  He is best known for his work on supply chain management, supply chain finance, operational excellence, and risk management.

Early life and education 
Kouvelis was born in Greece.  After graduating from National Technical University of Athens in 1983, he moved to the United States, where he went on to earn his MBA and MS from the Marshall School of Business at the University of Southern California.  In 1988, he earned his PhD from the Management Science and Engineering department at Stanford University.

Career 
Kouvelis served as an assistant professor at the University of Texas at Austin from 1988 to 1991 and an associate professor at Duke University's Fuqua School of Business from 1992 to 1997.  He visited Washington University in St. Louis from 1996 to 1997, where he accepted a full professor position in 1997.  He was installed as the inaugural Emerson Distinguished Professor of Operations and Manufacturing Management in 2000.  Kouvelis served as the senior associate dean and director of executive programs at the Olin Business School from 2009 to 2013, as well as area chair of the Operations and Manufacturing Management department from 2005 to 2009.  He has accepted visiting professorships at the WHU-Otto Beisheim School of Management, the University of Chicago, and Hong Kong Polytechnic University.

Kouvelis is an editor for the journals Production & Operations Management, Manufacturing and Service Operations Management, and Foundations and Trends in Technology, Information and Operations Management.

The Boeing Center for Supply Chain Innovation 
Kouvelis was a founding co-director of The Boeing Center for Technology, Information, and Manufacturing in 1997.  He became the director of the center in 2000, and continues to direct it.  The center was renamed to The Boeing Center for Supply Chain Innovation. (BCSCI) in 2016.

Awards and honors 
 Fellow of POMS Award (2016) - Lifetime achievement award for contributions in the field of operations management, awarded by the Production and Operations Management Society. (POMS)
Received Laudatio in the November 2020 issue of Production and Operations Management. This honorific recognition is reserved for scholars with significant contributions to the field of Operations Management via research and teaching.
 In a recent OM research productivity study published in Decision Sciences, Kouvelis was ranked:
 2 - Total number of papers, weighted for co-authorship (Management Science publications included in all departments, with some OM linkage)
 3 - Total number of papers , weighted for co-authorship (Management Science publications counted only in the OM department)
 3 - Total number of papers
 1 - Publications in MSOM
 Top 5 Operations Management Research Ranking (2015) - Ranked as the 5th most productive researcher in the field.

Bibliography 
 Research monograph on “Robust Discrete Optimization and its Applications.” Kluwer Academic Publishers, Amsterdam, 1997.
 Global Operations and Logistics: Text and Cases, Wiley, NY, 1998.
 “Supply chain management research and Production and Operations Management: Review, trends, and opportunities,” Prod Oper Manage 15(3):449-469, 2006.
 “Robust Scheduling to Hedge against Processing Time Uncertainty in Single-Stage Production.” Management Science 41(2):363–376, 1995.
 “Flexible and Risk Sharing Supply Contracts Under Price Uncertainty,” Management Science 45(10):1378–1398, 1999.
 "Financing the newsvendor: supplier vs. bank, and the structure of optimal trade credit contracts,” Operations Research 60(3):566-580, 2012.
"Impact of Tariffs on Global Supply Chain Network Configuration: Models, Predictions, and Future Research," Manufacturing & Service Operations Management, 2020.
"Cash Hedging in a Supply Chain," Management Science, 2019.
"Parkinson's Law and Its Implications for Project Management," Management Science, 1991.

References

External links 
 Panos Kouvelis' personal website
 Panos Kouvelis' faculty profile
 GScholar

 

Year of birth missing (living people)
Living people
National Technical University of Athens alumni
Marshall School of Business alumni
University of Texas at Austin faculty
Duke University faculty
Washington University in St. Louis faculty
University of Chicago Booth School of Business faculty
Academic staff of Hong Kong Polytechnic University